Frederica Susanna Mildmay, Countess FitzWalter, 3rd Countess of Mértola (née Schomberg, previously Frederica Darcy, Countess of Holderness; 1687 – 7 August 1751) was a British peeress.

Life
Frederica was the eldest surviving daughter, and co-heir, of Meinhardt Schomberg, 3rd Duke of Schomberg, and his second wife, Raugravine Caroline Elisabeth, a daughter of Charles I Louis, Elector Palatine. On 26 May 1715, she married Robert Darcy, 3rd Earl of Holderness, and they had two surviving children: 
 Hon. Robert Darcy (1718–1778); later 4th Earl of Holderness.
 Lady Caroline Darcy (d. 1778); who married William Kerr, 4th Marquess of Lothian.
On the death of the countess' father in 1719, she inherited his Portuguese countship of Mértola as his eldest surviving child. Her husband died in 1721 and on 18 June 1724, she married Hon. Benjamin Mildmay, who was later created Earl FitzWalter in 1730. They had one child, who died in infancy.

Via cognatic primogeniture, she was the most senior descendant of James I of England to be Protestant, but she was passed over for Sophia of Hanover. Her cognatic heir is Anthea Theresa Lycett (born Marcia Anne Miller), Countess of Mértola, eldest daughter of Diana, Baroness Conyers and Fauconberg and Countess of Mértola.

The countess was survived by her elderly second husband; on her death, at the age of 63, she was buried in the Mildmay family vault at St Mary's Church, Chelmsford, where he was also later buried.

References

FitzWalter, Frederica Mildmay, Countess
FitzWalter, Frederica Mildmay, Countess
Holderness
Fitzwalter
Counts of Mértola
Daughters of English dukes
Year of birth uncertain
British people of German descent
British Protestants